Gaz Khuzestan Futsal Club is an Iranian futsal club based in Ahvaz.

Season-by-season
The table below chronicles the achievements of the Club in various competitions.

Players

Current squad

Honours
 Iran Futsal's 1st Division
 Champions (1): 2011-12
 Iran Futsal's 2nd Division
 Champions (1): 2009
 Local League
 Runners-up (1): 2008-09
 Khuzestan League
 Champions (1): 2005

References

External links
 Official website

Futsal clubs in Iran
Sport in Ahvaz